is one of the 16 wards of the city of Nagoya in Aichi Prefecture, Japan. As of 1 October 2019, the ward had an estimated population of 165,863 and a population density of 9,123 persons per km². The total area was 18.18 km².

Geography
Chikusa Ward is located in northeastern Nagoya city.

Surrounding municipalities
Naka Ward
Higashi Ward
Moriyama Ward
Meitō Ward
Tenpaku Ward
Shōwa Ward

History
The town of Chikusa and the village of Higashiyama in Aichi District were annexed by the city of Nagoya on August 22, 1921, becoming part of Higashi Ward. Chikusa Ward was established in 1937.  On April 5, 1955 the neighboring village of Idaka was merged into Chikusa Ward.

Education
Nagoya University
Nagoya City University – Kita-Chikusa Campus
Sugiyama Jogakuen University
Aichi Gakuin University – Chikusa Campus
Aichi Shukutoku University – Chikusa Campus
Aichi Institute of Technology – Chikusa Campus

Transportation

Rail
JR Central - Chūō Main Line
 
Nagoya Municipal Subway – Higashiyama Line
  -  -  -  -  -  -
Nagoya Municipal Subway – Sakura-dōri Line
  - 
Nagoya Municipal Subway – Meijō Line
  -  -  -

Highways
Route 2 (Nagoya Expressway) 
Japan National Route 153

Local attractions
Nagoya University Museum
Furukawa Air Museum
Heiwa Park
Higashiyama Sky Tower
Higashiyama Zoo and Botanical Gardens
Shiroyama Hachimangū
Tōgan-ji
Nittai-ji
 Yōki-sō villa and garden

Noted people
Masahiro Andoh – musician
Miki Ando – professional figure skater
Yasutaro Koide – supercentenarian
Yukihiko Tsutsumi – television and film director
Keiko Toda – voice actress

References

External links

 Official website 
 General information 

 
Wards of Nagoya